The following Confederate Army units and commanders fought in the Battle of Island Number Ten during the American Civil War.  Order of battle compiled  from the official reports.

Abbreviations used

Military rank
 MG = Major General
 BG = Brigadier General
 Col = Colonel
 Ltc = Lieutenant Colonel
 Maj = Major
 Cpt = Captain
 Lt = Lieutenant

Other
 w = wounded
 mw = mortally wounded
 k = killed

Forces at Madrid Bend, February 28-March 17, 1862
BG John P. McCown

New Madrid Garrison
BG Alexander P. Stewart

Island No. 10 Garrison

Forces at Madrid Bend, March 19-April 7, 1862
MG John P. McCown
BG William W. Mackall

Confederate Navy Mississippi Flotilla
Commodore George N. Hollins

Notes

References
U.S. War Department, The War of the Rebellion: a Compilation of the Official Records of the Union and Confederate Armies, U.S. Government Printing Office, 1880–1901.

American Civil War orders of battle